The 1982–83 DFB-Pokal was the 40th season of the annual German football cup competition. It began on 27 August 1982 and ended on 11 June 1983. In the only DFB-Pokal final ever held between two clubs from the same city 1. FC Köln defeated Fortuna Köln 1–0.

Matches

First round

Replays

Second round

Replays

Round of 16

Replay

Quarter-finals

Replay

Semi-finals

Final

References

External links
 Official site of the DFB 
 Kicker.de 

1982-83
1982–83 in German football cups